John David Baker (born 4 January 1951) is a male former diver who competed for Great Britain and England. Baker represented Great Britain in the men's 3 metre springboard at the 1972 Summer Olympics.

He also represented England in the 3 metres springboard, at the 1970 British Commonwealth Games in Edinburgh, Scotland.

References

1951 births
English male divers
Divers at the 1970 British Commonwealth Games
Divers at the 1972 Summer Olympics
Olympic divers of Great Britain
Living people
Commonwealth Games competitors for England